Peggy Schibi (also known as Peggi Schibi) is an American television soap opera script writer.

Positions held
Another World
 Script Writer: 1987 - 1988

Days of Our Lives
 Script Editor: February 1997 - February 1999
 Script Writer: October 1986 - January 1987, September 1993 - February 1997

General Hospital
 Script Writer: 1983 - 1984, 1989

Guiding Light
 Script Writer: 1991 - 1993

Passions
 Script Writer: 1999 - 2007

Awards and nominations
Daytime Emmy Awards

WINS
(1993; Best Writing; Guiding Light)

NOMINATIONS 
(1984; Best Writing; General Hospital)
(1992; Best Writing; Guiding Light)
(1994, 1997, 1998 & 1999; Best Writing; Days of Our Lives)
(2001, 2002 & 2003; Best Writing; Passions)

Writers Guild of America Award

WINS
(2000 season; Days of Our Lives)

NOMINATIONS 
(1988 & 1994 seasons; Days of Our Lives)
(2001 season; Passions)

External links

American soap opera writers
Year of birth missing (living people)
Daytime Emmy Award winners
Women soap opera writers
American women television writers
Writers Guild of America Award winners
Living people
21st-century American women